Antonio Barroso Sánchez-Guerra (1893 – 1982), a general, was a senior member of the Francoist State in Spain. He was Minister of the Army between 25 February 1957 and 10 July 1962.

Barroso was also the main protector of the French fascist Louis Darquier, who was given asylum in Spain after World War II.

References

Bibliography
 Fernández de Córdoba, Fernando (1939): Memorias de un soldado locutor. Madrid, Ediciones Españolas S.A.
 Lojendio, Luís María de (1940): Operaciones militares de la guerra de España: 1936-1939. Prologue by Antonio Barroso. Barcelona, Ed. Montaner y Simon
 Pérez Fernández, Herminio: Guía política de España. Instituciones, ABC. 14 November 1976

1893 births
1982 deaths
Spanish anti-communists
Defence ministers of Spain
Spanish lieutenant generals